Pellegrino is an Italian surname. Notable people with the surname include:

Adriano Pellegrino (born 1984), Australian football player
Aline Pellegrino (born 1982), Brazilian football player
Andrea Pellegrino (born 1997), Italian tennis player
Charles R. Pellegrino (born 1953), American author
Christine Pellegrino, American politician
Edmund Pellegrino, American, chairman of the President's Council on Bioethics
Federico Pellegrino (born 1990), Italian cross-country skier
Frank Pellegrino (inventor), president of General Fibre Company and plastic molding machine inventor.
Frank Pellegrino (actor), American actor
Frank P. Pellegrino, philanthropist and former president and chairman of International Hat Company
Giovanni Pellegrino (born 1939), Italian politician
Itala Pellegrino (born 1865), Italian painter
Kurt Pellegrino (born 1979), American mixed martial artist
Loraine B. Pellegrino, listed as secretary for Arizona on false slate of Trump electors
Mark Pellegrino (born 1965), American actor
Mauricio Pellegrino (born 1971), Argentine football player
Maximiliano Pellegrino (born 1980), Argentine football player
Michele Pellegrino (1903–1986), Italian archbishop
Nicky Pellegrino, English-born New Zealand novelist
Patrizia Pellegrino (born 1962), Italian actress
San Danielo da Pellegrino (ca. 1480-1545), Italian painter
Vincenzo Pellegrino, English actor

Italian-language surnames